This is a list of video games for the PlayStation 3 video game console that have sold or shipped at least one million copies.

As of March 31, 2019, a total of over 999.4million copies of PlayStation 3 software had been sold worldwide.

List

Notes

References

 
PlayStation 3
Best-selling PlayStation 3 video games